Brook Park is a city in Cuyahoga County, Ohio, United States and a suburb of Cleveland. As of the 2020 Census, the city population was 18,595 .

Geography
Brook Park is located at  (41.399550, −81.818423).

While Brook Park's official name has always been spelled as two words, it is sometimes mistakenly seen spelled as one word, which is the spelling of nearby Brookpark Road.

History
Brook Park became a city in 1960.
The city attracted national attention when 21 Marines of the 3rd battalion, 25th Marines Regiment, 4th Marine division headquartered in the city were killed in combat in Iraq on August 1 and August 3, 2005. The unit lost 48 Marines during the course of the deployment. On August 5, the city government printed and distributed American flags for every household in the city to display on their windows. On August 8, thousands of citizens from throughout Northeast Ohio attended a memorial service to show their support for the fallen Marines. National, state and local politicians also voiced their mutual support for the families affected and for the ongoing support needed for all of the service members still involved in their mission overseas.

Thomas J. Coyne Jr. was re-elected mayor on November 5, 2013, after 12 years out of the office, which had been held by Mark J. Elliot. Coyne had been the Mayor of Brook Park from 1981 to 2002. Coyne is most known for the 2001 Cleveland Hopkins International Airport runway extension deal with then Mayor of Cleveland Michael R. White, which ceded Brook Park land including homes and the International Exposition Center (IX Center) to Cleveland in exchange for NASA Glenn Research Center and ten years of tax revenues from the IX Center. Coyne had originally came to Brook Park with his family at the age of nine from Cleveland around the time of the city's incorporation in 1960. He is an alumnus of St. Edwards in nearby Lakewood.

On November 7, 2017, former Brook Park council president Mike Gammella defeated Coyne in a four-person race. Gammella received 42% of the vote.

Demographics

93.9% spoke English, 1.8% Spanish, 1.2% German, and 0.6% Greek.

2010 census
As of the census of 2010, there were 19,212 people, 7,799 households, and 5,318 families living in the city. The racial makeup of the city was 92.2% White, 3.2% African American, 0.2% Native American, 1.6% Asian, 0.9% from other races, and 1.9% from two or more races. Hispanic or Latino of any race were 3.4% of the population.

There were 7,799 households, of which 28.7% had children under the age of 18 living with them, 48.6% were married couples living together, 14.6% had a female householder with no husband present, 5.1% had a male householder with no wife present, and 31.8% were non-families. 27.6% of all households were made up of individuals, and 13.5% had someone living alone who was 65 years of age or older. The average household size was 2.45 and the average family size was 2.97.

The median age in the city was 43.8 years. 21% of residents were under the age of 18; 7.5% were between the ages of 18 and 24; 23.2% were from 25 to 44; 28.3% were from 45 to 64; and 19.8% were 65 years of age or older. The gender makeup of the city was 48.0% male and 52.0% female.

2000 census
As of the census of 2000, there were 21,218 people, 8,193 households, and 5,989 families living in the city. The population density was 2,815.1 people per square mile (1,086.5/km2). There were 8,370 housing units at an average density of 1,110.5 per square mile (428.6/km2). The racial makeup of the city was 94.49% White, 1.95% African American, 0.23% Native American, 1.26% Asian, 0.77% from other races, and 1.30% from two or more races. Hispanic or Latino of any race were 1.99% of the population.

There were 8,193 households, out of which 29.0% had children under the age of 18 living with them, 57.3% were married couples living together, 12.0% had a female householder with no husband present, and 26.9% were non-families. 23.6% of all households were made up of individuals, and 10.8% had someone living alone who was 65 years of age or older. The average household size was 2.58 and the average family size was 3.06.

In the city the population was spread out, with 22.8% under the age of 18, 7.2% from 18 to 24, 28.8% from 25 to 44, 24.2% from 45 to 64, and 17.1% who were 65 years of age or older. The median age was 40 years. For every 100 females, there were 95.4 males. For every 100 females age 18 and over, there were 90.7 males.

The median income for a household in the city was $46,333, and the median income for a family was $53,324. Males had a median income of $40,202 versus $25,943 for females. The per capita income for the city was $20,411. About 3.5% of families and 4.6% of the population were below the poverty line, including 7.3% of those under age 18 and 3.7% of those age 65 or over.

Education
Brook Park is part of the Berea City School District.  Elementary students attend Brook Park Elementary school. Middle School students attend Middleburg Heights Junior High School (former Midpark High School), in the neighboring city of Middleburg Heights;  High school students attend Berea-Midpark High School, in the neighboring city of Berea.

Economy

Top employers
According to Brook Park's 2020 Comprehensive Annual Financial Report, the top employers in the city were:

See also
 Cleveland Engine

References

External links

 City of Brook Park

Cities in Ohio
Cities in Cuyahoga County, Ohio